Ormari Romero Turcás (born February 22, 1968 in Segundo Frente, Santiago de Cuba Province, Cuba) is a right-handed pitcher for the Cuba national baseball team and Santiago de Cuba of the Cuban National Series.

Romero was part of the Cuba national baseball team that brought home the gold medal from the 1996 Summer Olympics. He was 2-1 for the silver medal-win by Cuba at the 2006 World Baseball Classic.

References

External links
 

1968 births
Living people
Olympic baseball players of Cuba
Olympic gold medalists for Cuba
Olympic medalists in baseball
Medalists at the 1996 Summer Olympics
Baseball players at the 1996 Summer Olympics
Pan American Games gold medalists for Cuba
Baseball players at the 1999 Pan American Games
2006 World Baseball Classic players
Pan American Games medalists in baseball
Medalists at the 1999 Pan American Games
People from Santiago de Cuba Province